I Am Sorry Mathe Banni Preethsona is a 2011 Kannada language romance film directed by Ravindra H P Das . It stars Prem Kumar and Karishma Tanna in  lead roles. The music is composed by Anoop Seelin . Vinay Narkar has jointly produced the film with Ravindra.  The film released on 17 June 2011. Ravindra H.P. Das got the Best Screenplay Award from Karnataka State Film Awards for the movie.

Cast
 Prem Kumar as Shyam
 Karishma Tanna as Chetana
 Sanjjanaa Galrani as Sinchana
 Tabla Nani
 Sumithra
 Vinaya Prasad
 Dileep Raj
 Amritha Chabria
 Anand
 Kritika Pandey
 Manoj Karthik
 Yukti Kapoor
 Srinagar Kitty in a special appearance
 Nidhi Subbaiah in a special appearance

Soundtrack
Anoop Seelin composed the soundtrack and score for the film. The lyrics have been written by Arasu Anthare, V. Nagendra Prasad, Guruprasad, Shankar Guru, Janamitra Anand and the director Ravindra H. P.

Reception

Critical response 
A critic from The Times of India scored the film at 4 out of 5 stars and wrote "Prem is back to his form, Karishma is credible as his wife. Its Sanjanas performance as a sex worker that adds drama to the story. Anoop Seelinsfoot-tapping tunes will impress the youth. Ashok Kashyaps cinematography is commendable". Shruti Indira Lakshminarayana from Rediff.com scored the film at 2.5 out of 5 stars and says "Gurprasad's dialogues -- romantic, philosophical and comic -- will draw whistles. Anup Silin's songs are a definite advantage. Ashok Kashyap handle's the camera well. If you are a Prem fan and are bored of the run of the mill romantic stories, go find out for yourself". A critic from The New Indian Express wrote "His dialogues are meaningful. Cinematographer Ashok Kashyap has done a neat job behind the camera. Anup Seelin has composed foot-tapping tunes. Songs are good, especially the song —‘Joojuba Joojuba’ — is hummable. The movie is worth watching for all, especially husbands who suspect their sincere and loving wives". B S Srivani from Deccan Herald wrote "Camerawork too measures up to expectations. But for a climax that drags and cheap gimmicks prior to the release, Matthe Banni Prithsona is quite an interesting offering". A critic from News18 India wrote "Anoop Sileen has given different tunes for all the five songs of the film. Ashok Kashyap is as usual exceptional behind the camera. 'I'm Sorry Mathe Banni Preethsona' is a must watch".

Awards
 Karnataka State Film Award for Best Screenplay - Ravindra H. P

References

External links 

2011 films
2011 romance films
Indian romance films
2010s Kannada-language films
Films scored by Anoop Seelin